Juan Martín del Potro was the defending champion, but withdrew with a wrist injury.

Kei Nishikori won the title, defeating Milos Raonic in the final, 7–6(7–5), 4–6, 6–4.

Seeds

 Stan Wawrinka (first round)
 David Ferrer (first round)
 Milos Raonic (final)
 Kei Nishikori (champion)
 Jo-Wilfried Tsonga (first round)
 Roberto Bautista Agut (first round, retired)
 Kevin Anderson (second round)
 Alexandr Dolgopolov (first round)

Draw

Finals

Top half

Bottom half

Qualifying

Seeds

 James Ward (qualifying competition, retired)
 Pierre-Hugues Herbert (qualified)
 James Duckworth (qualifying competition)
 Michał Przysiężny (qualified)
 Rajeev Ram (qualified)
 Hiroki Moriya (qualified)
 Thanasi Kokkinakis (qualifying competition)
 Yasutaka Uchiyama (qualifying competition)

Qualifiers

Qualifying draw

First qualifier

Second qualifier

Third qualifier

Fourth qualifier

External links
Main draw
Qualifying draw

Rakuten Japan Open Tennis Championships - Singles